Mark Berry (born September 22, 1962 in Oxnard, California) is the former third base coach for the Cincinnati Reds. He spent 27 seasons in the Reds organization as a player, coach, and manager.

Early life
Berry graduated from Hueneme High School in Oxnard in 1981. He played college baseball at Oxnard Junior College and the University of Arkansas.

Playing career
The Reds selected Berry in the 6th round of the 1984 draft with the 137th overall pick. He was signed by baseball scout Bill Clark. In his seven seasons as a Reds minor leaguer he, predominantly, played catcher, but also played first base, third base, nine games in the outfield, and one game at shortstop. He was a Pioneer League All-Star catcher in his first season in 1984, then was the Most Valuable Player for the Tampa Tarpons in 1986 and was ranked the organization's eight-best prospect in 1985 and 1987. He retired as a player in 1990.

Coaching career

Minor leagues
When Berry retired as a player from the Charleston Wheelers, he stayed with the team as a coach. A month later, he went from Charleston to Plant City of the Gulf Coast League as a coach. He spent the 1991 season as the pitching coach for the Cedar Rapids Reds. The following year he managed the Cedar Rapids Reds to a Midwest League championship title. In 1993, he managed the Winston-Salem Spirit to the Carolina League title.

In 1996, Berry began his managerial tenure for the Chattanooga Lookouts, the Double-A affiliate of the Reds. The team won the division in his first season, earning him the Southern League Manager of the Year award. In 1997, he was named the Southern League's Best Managerial Prospect by Baseball America. He managed the Lookouts until 1998. He finished his minor league managerial career with a 506-463 record (.522), two league championships, three division titles, and made the post-season four of his seven seasons.

Major Leagues
Berry went to spring training in 1999 scheduled to be the hitting coach for class-AAA Indianapolis, but remained with Cincinnati as the bullpen catcher. He remained the bullpen catcher until July 28, 2003, when he was named the Reds bench coach. The following offseason Berry was named third base coach. As well as being the Reds third base coach, Berry was also the spring training and regular season daily coordinator for the Reds.

References
Baseball Reference (minors)
  Reds.com – Roster – Coaches – Mark Berry
  The Baseball Cube – People – Coaches – Mark Berry

Billings Mustangs players
Cedar Rapids Reds players
Arkansas Razorbacks baseball players
Oxnard Condors baseball players
Tampa Tarpons (1957–1987) players
Vermont Reds players
Nashville Sounds players
Greensboro Hornets players
Charleston Wheelers players
Chattanooga Lookouts managers
1962 births
Living people
Cincinnati Reds coaches
Sportspeople from Oxnard, California
Major League Baseball bullpen catchers
Baseball players from California
Sportspeople from Ventura County, California